Wybren Ridley van Haga (born 31 January 1967) is a Dutch politician and engineer who has been a member of the House of Representatives since 2017. He was initially elected as a member of the People's Party for Freedom and Democracy (VVD), but was expelled from the party in 2019, causing the third Rutte cabinet to lose its parliamentary majority. Van Haga subsequently sat as an independent MP before joining Thierry Baudet's Forum for Democracy party, where he was placed second on the party list in the 2021 election. He has since quit Forum for Democracy and created his own political party Belang van Nederland.

Early life, education and military service
Van Haga was born in 1967 in The Hague and grew up in Haarlem. His father is Dutch and his mother was originally from Britain. He completed the gymnasium with the natural sciences specialization. He studied electrical engineering at the Delft University of Technology. He also completed the first phase of a law study at Leiden University. He served his mandatory military service as a commando.

Business career
He subsequently worked as an engineer for the Shell Oil Company, and was based variously in Scotland, Gabon and Oman before starting a property development business.

Political career 
Van Haga first joined the VVD in 1992. In 2010, he was elected as a municipal councilor in Haarlem. During the 2017 general election, he was elected as an MP for the VVD in the House of Representatives. During the election, his candidacy was endorsed by Labour Party politician and former mayor of Haarlem Bernt Schneiders.

In 2017, Van Haga was investigated over an alleged concealment of a number of problems with local regulations during his time as a councilor. In 2019, he was expelled from the VVD parliamentary group after he was convicted for drunk driving and accused of interfering with his business operation as an MP. This caused the third Rutte cabinet to lose their parliamentary majority. Van Haga subsequently sat as an independent before announcing he had become a member of the Forum for Democracy party. Van Haga already had close ties with the FvD group as an independent.

Van Haga left FvD together with two others in response to a poster put out by the party which compared the COVID-19 lockdowns to the Nazi occupation of the Netherlands. He has since created his own political party called Belang van Nederland (BVNL). The new party has three seats in the House of Representatives. Van Haga has described it as 'classical liberal' and 'right-wing'.

Personal life 
Van Haga is married and has four children.

Electoral history

Notes

References

External links 
 
 Ir. W.R. (Wybren) van Haga, Parlement.com

1967 births
Living people
Dutch people of British descent
20th-century Dutch businesspeople
20th-century Dutch engineers
21st-century Dutch businesspeople
21st-century Dutch engineers
21st-century Dutch politicians
Delft University of Technology alumni
Dutch electrical engineers
Dutch political party founders
Forum for Democracy (Netherlands) politicians
Independent politicians in the Netherlands
Members of the House of Representatives (Netherlands)
Municipal councillors of Haarlem
People's Party for Freedom and Democracy politicians
Real estate and property developers
Belang van Nederland politicians